Bishop Fenwick High School (better known simply as "Fenwick") is a private Roman Catholic high school in Peabody, Massachusetts.   While located in the Roman Catholic Archdiocese of Boston, the school is operated independently and with the blessing of the Archdiocese.  Students who attend Bishop Fenwick come from over 40 towns and communities in New England, primarily those closest to the campus such as Saugus, Salem, Peabody, Beverly, Marblehead, and Danvers, Massachusetts. The school also has a small number of international students, having welcomed its first international students in 2014.

Background
Bishop Fenwick High School was founded in 1959 by the late Cardinal Richard Cushing and was named for the second bishop of Boston, Benedict Joseph Fenwick, S.J.  The school was the first coeducational Catholic high school on Boston's North Shore and was staffed by the Sisters of Notre Dame de Namur.   In 2003, the Archdiocese of Boston relinquished control of its "Central High Schools," including Fenwick, in response to financial difficulties in the wake of the child sex abuse scandal.  The Archdiocese still owns the property and is involved in school governance, making appointments to the board of trustees; for that reason it is not considered truly independent.  It is, however, financially independent of the umbrella of the archdiocese of Boston.

As of the 2018-19 school year, it was one of the ten largest coeducational high schools in the Archdiocese of Boston, with a student body of 565.

In the summer of 2018, it was announced that Fenwick will assume sponsorship of St. Mary of the Annunciation School in Danvers, Massachusetts.

Athletics
Bishop Fenwick's Crusaders have athletic programs in 26 interscholastic sports at a variety of levels, primarily competing in the Boston area's Catholic Central League.  On a yearly basis over fifty percent of Fenwick students take part in at least one sport, and over the course of their four years, over 80% of the students participate in one or more sport.

The school's teams have won state championships in boys' sports in baseball (2004), football (1965, 1999, 2000, 2013), hockey, and indoor and outdoor track.

Girls' teams winning state championships have included softball (1990, 1991,1992, 1993, 1994, 1995, 1996, 1997), field hockey, cross-country track (1980), basketball (2016), and indoor and outdoor track (2015).

Drama Club
The Bishop Fenwick Drama Club has been a well-respected and vital part of the school's artistic landscape. Each year, the Club presents both a fall play as well as a musical in the spring.

Notable alumni
Frederick Berry, disability rights advocate and member of Massachusetts senate
Pat Downey, football player
Matt Farley, musician and film-maker
Alex Newell, actor and singer
Ashley Phillips, soccer player
Sonja Santelises, school district administrator
Tod Murphy, basketball coach and former NBA player

Notes and references

External links
 School Website

Schools in Essex County, Massachusetts
Educational institutions established in 1959
Catholic secondary schools in Massachusetts
1959 establishments in Massachusetts
Sisters of Notre Dame de Namur schools